The 2009 Bristol City Council elections were held on Thursday 4 June 2009, for 23 seats, that being one-third of the total number of councilors. The Liberal Democrats who had been leading a minority administration, won an overall majority of the council, the first time the party had achieved this on Bristol City Council. The Liberal Democrats were defending 11 seats, the Labour Party 10 and the Conservatives 2.

The party standings following the election:

Ward results

Ashley

Avonmouth

Bishopston

Cabot

Clifton

Clifton East

Cotham

Easton

Eastville

Frome Vale

Henbury

Henleaze

Hillfields

Horfield

Kingsweston

Lawrence Hill

Lockleaze

Redland

Southmead

St George East

St George West

Stoke Bishop

Westbury-on-Trym

See also
 Politics of Bristol
 2009 United Kingdom local elections

References
Wards up for election in 2009

2009 English local elections
2009
2000s in Bristol